Merle Flowers (born October 20, 1968) is an American businessman and politician from the state of Mississippi. A member of the Republican Party, Flowers served in the Mississippi State Senate.

Flowers retired from the Mississippi Senate in 2012 to spend more time with his family. Flowers is Chairman of the Board for Methodist LeBonheur Healthcare Olive Branch Hospital. Flowers is former Scoutmaster of Boy Scout Troop 241 and father of 5 Palm Eagle Scout, Jackson Flowers. He is President of Flowers Properties, LLC in DeSoto County. He is a member of The Well Methodist Church in Lewisburg. Flowers serves on two statewide Boards; The Mississippi Development Bank and The Mississippi Business Finance Corporation.

References

External links

1968 births
Living people
People from Camden, Tennessee
People from Olive Branch, Mississippi
Auburn University alumni
University of Mississippi alumni
Republican Party Mississippi state senators
21st-century American politicians